The 2015–16 College of Charleston Cougars women's basketball team represented the College of Charleston during the 2015–16 NCAA Division I women's basketball season. The Cougars, led by second year head coach Candice M. Jackson, played their home games at the TD Arena and were members of the Colonial Athletic Association. They finished the season 11–20, 5–13 CAA play to finish in eighth place. They advanced to the quarterfinals of the CAA women's tournament where they lost to James Madison.

Roster

Schedule

|-
!colspan=9 style="background:#800000; color:#F0E68C;"| Exhibition

|-
!colspan=9 style="background:#800000; color:#F0E68C;"| Non-conference regular season

|-
!colspan=9 style="background:#800000; color:#F0E68C;"| CAA regular season

|-
!colspan=9 style="background:#800000; color:#F0E68C;"| CAA Women's Tournament

See also
 2015–16 College of Charleston Cougars men's basketball team

References

College of Charleston Cougars women's basketball seasons
College Of Charleston